Cao Cao (155–220) was a warlord who rose to power towards the final years of the Eastern Han dynasty (25–220 CE) and became the de facto head of government in China. He laid the foundation for what was to become the state of Cao Wei (220–265), founded by his son and successor Cao Pi, in the Three Kingdoms period (220–280). Poetry, among other things, was one of his cultural legacies.

Overview
Cao Cao was an accomplished poet, as were his sons Cao Pi and Cao Zhi. Cao Cao was also a patron of poets such as Xu Gan. Of Cao Cao's works, only a remnant remain today. His verses, unpretentious yet profound, helped to reshape the poetic style of his time and beyond, eventually contributing to the poetry styles associated with Tang Dynasty poetry. Cao Cao, Cao Pi and Cao Zhi are known collectively as the "Three Caos". The Three Caos' poetry, together with additional poets, eventually developed into the Jian'an style: Jian'an was the era name for the period from 196 to 220. Poets of the Cao family and others continued to write and develop the poetry of this style, after the end of the Han Dynasty and the subsequent founding of the Cao Wei state: these were the Jian'an poets. The effects of civil strife on poetry towards the end of the Eastern Han Dynasty contributed to the development of a solemn and heart-stirring tone of lament for life's ephemeral nature during the period of Jian'an poetry.

From its roots in Han poetry folk songs, Jian'an poetry evolved into a form of scholarly poetry that is characteristic of Six Dynasties poetry. Cao Cao and other Jian'an poets developed the characteristic Han fu (or yuefu) poetry style deriving from folk song or ballad traditions, such as of uneven line lengths. Irregular lines became transformed into regular five-character line-length styles, very similar (and inspirational to) the shi poetry of the Tang Dynasty's five-character regular line. Cao Cao has specifically been noted for his ballad-style verse, which he apparently set to music.

Cao Cao also wrote verse in the older four-character per line style characteristic of the Classic of Poetry. Burton Watson describes Cao Cao as: "the only writer of the period who succeeded in infusing the old four-character metre with any vitality, mainly because he discarded the archaic diction associated with it and employed the ordinary poetic language of his time." Cao Cao is also known for his early contributions to the Shanshui poetry genre, with his 4-character-per-line, 14-line poem "View of the Blue Sea" (as translated by Wai-lim Yip).

Poems

Though the Tortoise Lives Long
One of Cao Cao's most celebrated pieces, written in the old four-character line style, is titled Though the Tortoise Lives Long (龜雖壽). It is one part of a four-part poem titled Steps through the Illustrious Gate (步出夏門行). It was written during the Battle of White Wolf Mountain in 207.

Short Song Style

Another of Cao Cao's most well known poems is Short Song Style (短歌行).

See also
 Cao Cao
 Chinese poetry
 Jian'an poetry
 Shanshui poetry

Notes

References and further reading
 
 
 Yip, Wai-lim (1997). Chinese Poetry: An Anthology of Major Modes and Genres. (Durham and London: Duke University Press). 
 

Chinese poems
Chinese poetry collections
Han dynasty poetry
Jian'an poetry
Cao Cao
Cao Cao